Raúl Alberto González (born 9 June 1976) is an Argentine footballer currently playing in Italy for the Serie D club U.S. Darfo Boario S.S.D.

External links
 Raúl Alberto González at BDFA.com.ar 
 Raúl Alberto González – Argentine Primera statistics at Fútbol XXI 

People from General López Department
Argentine footballers
Argentine expatriate footballers
Atlético de Rafaela footballers
Brescia Calcio players
U.S. Salernitana 1919 players
F.C. Crotone players
Cosenza Calcio 1914 players
Expatriate footballers in Italy
Argentine Primera División players
Primera Nacional players
Serie A players
Serie B players
Quilmes Atlético Club footballers
1976 births
Living people
A.S.D. Martina Calcio 1947 players
Argentine expatriate sportspeople in Italy
Association football forwards
Sportspeople from Santa Fe Province